Thomas Hubert Donaldson (6 August 1882 –  1960) was an English first-class cricketer and barrister.

Donaldson was born in August 1882 at Streatham. He later studied at Worcester College at the University of Oxford, where he made a single appearance in first-class cricket for Oxford University against Surrey at The Oval in 1906. Batting twice in the match, Donaldson was dismissed for 7 runs in the Oxford first innings by George Gamble, while in their second innings he was unbeaten on 31. 

After graduating from Oxford, Donaldson was called to the bar as a member of the Middle Temple in November 1910. He later emigrated to South Africa, where he died at Johannesburg prior to 1960.

References

External links

1882 births
Date of death unknown
People from Streatham
Alumni of Worcester College, Oxford
English cricketers
Oxford University cricketers
Members of the Middle Temple
English barristers
English emigrants to South Africa